Svyato-Dukhov Monastery (Monastery of the Holy Spirit) may refer to Eastern Orthodox monasteries:

 Monastery of the Holy Spirit (Vilnus)
 Monastery of the Holy Spirit (Vitebsk)